David H. Thompson is an American trial attorney and the managing partner of the law firm Cooper & Kirk, PLLC, a litigation boutique.

Thompson has litigated numerous high-profile cases, including civil litigation on behalf of the Duke lacrosse players, challenges to a wide variety of gun control laws around the country, civil rights claims, First Amendment challenges, and separation of powers issues. Beyond constitutional law, he has also secured several large trial verdicts in commercial disputes, including a $205 million trial verdict in AmBase Corporation v. United States.  This case was hailed as a "remarkable victory" for the "AmBase legal team, led by David H Thompson." He frequently advises government whistleblowers in qui tam matters. In 2020, he cooperated with the State of Arizona to bring a lawsuit against Google, “alleging the tech giant uses deceptive and unfair practices to get users’ location data and fuel its massive advertising business.”  Thompson has been described as "highly skilled in managing protracted and complex litigation with [a] demonstrated track-record."

On December 9, 2020, Thompson presented his first oral argument at the United States Supreme Court in Collins v. Mnunchin.  The issues in that case concerned separation of powers and consequences when government actors exceed their constitutional authority. This case was an appeal from a 5th Circuit Court of Appeals decision in which Thompson and his clients "notched a win in their years long challenge to the U.S. sweep of nearly all of the mortgage-finance giants’ profits, a victory in their fight for gains from the companies’ return to profitability."

Thompson testified before the House Judiciary Committee concerning the government's conduct in the Operation Choke Point Scandal. He also represented former Attorney General John Ashcroft in connection with his testimony on the DOJ’s so called “torture memos” before the House Judiciary Committee.

In the 2020 election cycle, Thompson was involved in litigation aimed at ensuring ballot integrity and preventing voter fraud.  He represented Republican legislative leaders in defending North Carolina's voter ID law.  He represented the North Carolina General Assembly in Moore v. Harper at the Supreme Court in 2022, advocating for the Independent state legislature theory.

Thompson has also served as a visiting professor at both Georgetown University Law Center and at University of Georgia Law School. At both institutions, he has taught classes on how to litigate high-profile cases.

Thompson was awarded an AB degree, magna cum laude, from Harvard University in 1991, where he was elected to Phi Beta Kappa. In 1994, Thompson received a JD degree, cum laude, from Harvard Law School.

References

American lawyers
Harvard Law School alumni
Living people
Year of birth missing (living people)